Tun Syed Sheh Al-Haj bin Syed Hassan Barakbah (10 November 1906 – 8 October 1975) was a prominent Malaysian judge. He was the second Lord President of the Federal Court, and the first Malaysian to hold that office. After his career in the judiciary, he briefly served as President of the Dewan Negara and later Yang di-Pertua Negeri (Governor) of Penang.

Early life and education 
Born in Alor Star, Kedah, Syed Sheh is of Hadhrami-Malay descent; his Arab ancestors had migrated from Hadhramaut and settled in Kedah for several generations. Being of the Barakbah clan, he is related to Sharifah Rodziah Syed Alwi Barakbah, the third wife of the first Prime Minister of Malaysia, Tunku Abdul Rahman.

Syed received his education at the Sultan Abdul Hamid College before continuing his studies in England sponsored by the Kedah State Government's scholarship. He was accepted to read law at the Inner Temple and graduated in 1934 with a Bachelor of Laws (LLB) degree.

Career
Syed Sheh began his career in the judiciary as a special magistrate in the Colonial Legal Service in 1946. After independence, he served as a judge on the Court of Appeal and in 1963, was appointed Chief Justice of Malaya. In 1968, Syed Sheh succeeded Tun Sir James Thomson as Lord President of the Federal Court, then the highest office in the Malaysian judiciary. He was the first Malaysian to serve in that capacity.

After retiring as Lord President, Syed Sheh was appointed as a Senator in the Dewan Negara, the upper house of the Parliament of Malaysia. He became President of the Dewan Negara in 1969, serving for little over a week until early February. He retired from the Senate later that month and was appointed the third Governor of the state of Penang by Yang di-Pertuan Agong Tuanku Ismail Nasiruddin. He served two terms (four years, then two years) until February 1975.

In becoming Lord President, President of the Dewan Negara and Governor of Penang, Syed Sheh has served in senior positions in the Malaysian executive, legislative and judicial branches of government.

Death
Tun Syed Sheh died on 8 October 1975, in Alor Star, Kedah.

Legacy
The Esplanade Road in George Town, Penang was renamed as Jalan Tun Syed Sheikh Barakbah.

Honours

Honours of Penang
As 3rd Yang di-Pertua Negeri of Penang ( – )
  :
  Knight Grand Commander (DUPN) with title Dato' Seri Utama
  Grand Master of the Order of the Defender of State

Honours of Malaysia
  :
  Commander of the Order of the Defender of the Realm (PMN) – Tan Sri (1964)
  Grand Commander of the Order of Loyalty to the Crown of Malaysia (SSM) – Tun (1968)
  Grand Commander of the Order of the Defender of the Realm (SMN) – Tun (1970)
  :
  Knight Grand Commander of the Exalted Order of the Crown of Kedah (SPMK) – Dato' Seri (1969)

Foreign honours
  :
  Fourth Class of the Most Blessed Order of Setia Negara Brunei (PSB)

References

 

Malaysian people of Yemeni descent
Yang di-Pertua Negeri of Penang
1906 births
1975 deaths
Members of the Dewan Negara
Chief justices of Malaysia
Malaysian people of Malay descent
Malaysian Muslims
People from Kedah
Hadhrami people
Presidents of the Dewan Negara
20th-century Malaysian judges
Members of the Inner Temple
Grand Commanders of the Order of the Defender of the Realm
Grand Commanders of the Order of Loyalty to the Crown of Malaysia
Colonial Legal Service officers